Sokollu Mehmet Pasha caravanserai is a 16th-century  caravanserai in Payas, Turkey.

Location
It is easily accessible from Turkish state highway  which connects İskenderun to North. There is also a castle to the west of the caravanserai.

History
Payas is a seaside town on the Mediterranean Sea. In the 1567–68 term, Ottoman government Sublime Porte  built a shipyard in Payas in preparation for the Cyprus campaign. After the conquest of Cyprus in 1571, the Grand vizier Sokollu Mehmet   Pasha built the caravansarai financing it privately. The architect of the caravanserai was Mimar Sinan. It is not known if Sinan actually supervised the construction. According to the inscription of the caravanserai, it was completed in 1574.

The building
The purpose of the caravanserai was to provide accommodation for merchants traveling to nearby Aleppo, and for the pilgrims on the wat to Mecca. In addition to trade section, it has many units such as a mosque, a hammam, a madrasa etc. Thus, some sources call it a külliye, a building complex. (For the plan of the caravanserai see Plan).

Present usage
The caravanserai was restored by the Payas municipality (now a branch of İskenderun municipality) between 2011 and 2013. The municipality won for this project the ÇEKÜL (Protection and Promotion of the Environment and Cultural Heritage) award. After the restoration, the caravanserai was put into use. The western part of the complex is dedicated to the shops just like the traditional usage while the eastern part is now used by the  municipality offices.

References

Buildings and structures in Hatay Province
Buildings and structures of the Ottoman Empire
Caravanserais in Turkey
Buildings and structures completed in 1574